Decipiphantes is a monotypic genus of dwarf spiders containing the species Decipiphantes decipiens. It was first described by Michael I. Saaristo & A. V. Tanasevitch in 1996, and has only been found in Belarus, Kazakhstan, Mongolia, and Russia.

See also
 List of Linyphiidae species

References

Linyphiidae
Monotypic Araneomorphae genera
Spiders of Asia